Melody Cruise is a 1933 American pre-Code musical romantic comedy film directed by Mark Sandrich, his first feature film with sound.  The film received praise for Sandrich's creative direction and solidly established him as a commercial director.

Plot
On a cruise liner, a bachelor millionaire is subject to the attention of women who are seeking a rich husband.

Principal cast
 June Brewster as Zoe
 Shirley Chambers as Vera
 Chick Chandler as the steward Hickey
 Marjorie Gateson as Mrs Grace Wells
 Phil Harris as Alan Chandler
 Helen Mack as Laurie Marlowe
 Greta Nissen as Elsa Von Rader 
 Florence Roberts as Miss Potts
 Charles Ruggles as Pete Wells

Uncredited
 Betty Grable as a stewardess

Box office
The movie made a profit of $150,000.

Reception
New York Times critic Mordaunt Hall found the film to be a "conventional farce", but praised "the imaginative direction of Mark Sandrich, who is alert in seizing any opportunity for cinematic stunts" and whose work gave the production "a foreign aspect" with "some extraordinarily clever photography".

References

External links

 Melody Cruise, imdb.com; accessed January 27, 2016.
 
 
 

1933 films
American romantic comedy films
Films directed by Mark Sandrich
1933 romantic comedy films
RKO Pictures films
1930s American films